Yotam Tepper is an Israeli archaeologist who discovered the Megiddo church complex, the oldest Christian house of worship ever discovered, under the modern Megiddo prison. Dated to the middle of the 3rd century AD, it is believed to be the earliest Christian site of worship ever discovered. Countless Roman relics were discovered alongside the church.

References

External links
 Vassilios Tzaferis, Inscribed “To God Jesus Christ”: Early Christian Prayer Hall Found in Megiddo Prison Biblical Archaeology Review, March/April 2007

Israeli archaeologists
Living people
Year of birth missing (living people)